Hemidactylus parvimaculatus, also known as the spotted house gecko or the Sri Lankan house gecko, is a species of gecko from South Asia and Indian Ocean.

Description
The body has many tubercles and the tail has rings of small spines. Coloration is light grey to tan; there are dark blotches that form three rows along the back. The belly is pinkish-cream.

Distribution
This gecko is found in Sri Lanka, southern India, Reunion, Mauritius and Rodrigues, Moheli (Comoro Islands), Maldives, and Mascarene Islands. There are also introduced populations in Bangkok, Thailand, and in the southern United States.

Ecology
In Sri Lanka, Hemidactylus parvimaculatus has been recorded to prey upon Ramanella variegata frogs and insects. It can also be cannibalistic.

References

parvimaculatus
Reptiles of the Comoros
Reptiles of India
Reptiles of the Maldives
Fauna of the Mascarene Islands
Reptiles of Sri Lanka
Reptiles of Thailand
Taxa named by Paulus Edward Pieris Deraniyagala
Reptiles described in 1953